The Tour Majunga is a skyscraper located in La Défense, near Paris, France.

The main architect of the tower is Jean-Paul Viguier.

South Korean investment banking company, Mirae Asset Daewoo Co. Ltd., and French asset manager Amundi has been picked as the preferable bidders at about US$960 million for the building as of 3 March 2019.

See also 
 List of tallest buildings and structures in the Paris region
 Mirae Asset Daewoo set to acquire Tour Majunga

References 

La Défense
Office buildings completed in 2014
Skyscrapers in Paris
21st-century architecture in France